"Revenge" is a song by American singer and songwriter Pink featuring American rapper Eminem. It was written by the artists alongside Max Martin and Shellback. The song was announced to be released through RCA Records in late 2017 as the second single from Pink's seventh studio album, Beautiful Trauma (2017), however the title track was released on November 21 instead.

Music video
The official unfinished music video surfaced on Vimeo on May 23, 2019, but only gained notoriety in July 2020, being removed shortly thereafter from the platform.

Charts

Certifications

References

External links
 

2017 songs
Eminem songs
Pink (singer) songs
Songs written by Max Martin
Songs written by Pink (singer)
Songs written by Eminem
Songs written by Shellback (record producer)